The women's artistic individual all-around competition of the gymnastics events at the 2011 Pan American Games in Guadalajara, Mexico, was held on October 26 at the Nissan Gymnastics Stadium.

Final

References

Events at the 2011 Pan American Games
Gymnastics at the 2011 Pan American Games
All-around artistic gymnastics
2011 in women's gymnastics